Samuel Blackham (19 August 1890–1956) was an English footballer who played in the Football League for Bradford Park Avenue and Halifax Town.

References

1890 births
1956 deaths
English footballers
Association football defenders
English Football League players
Tottenham Hotspur F.C. players
Barrow A.F.C. players
Bradford (Park Avenue) A.F.C. players
Halifax Town A.F.C. players